A Snakebite is an injury caused by the bite of a snake.

Snakebite or snake bite may also refer to:

Music
 Snakebite, a German band that featured Doro
 Snakebite (album), a 1978 album by Whitesnake
 "Snakebite," a song from Alice Cooper's album Hey Stoopid
 "Snakebite," a song from Big D and the Kids Table's album Strictly Rude
 "Snakebite," a song from Judas Priest's album Redeemer of Souls

Other
 Snakebite (drink), an alcoholic beverage made with beer and cider
 Snake Bite (truck), a monster truck
 Snakebite Township, Bertie County, North Carolina, a former municipality in the United States
 Peter Wright (darts player), darts player nicknamed Snakebite
 Snake bites, a type of lip piercing, or any two body piercings placed side by side
 Young Sherlock Holmes: Snake Bite, a novel written by Andy Lane
 Indian burn (prank), an abusive prank where the prankster twists another persons forearm/wrist